Margita Tomanová (née Polanová; born 13 November 1953) is a Slovak chess player, Czechoslovak Women's Chess Championship winner (1974).

Biography
In the 1970s, Margita Tomanová was one of the leading Czechoslovakian women's chess players. In 1974 she won Czechoslovak Women's Chess Championship. In 1975, in Karlovy Vary Margita Tomanová participated in Women's World Chess Championship European Zonal tournament where shared 12th-13th places with Anna Jurczyńska.

Margita Tomanová played for Czechoslovakia in the Women's Chess Olympiad:
 * In 1974, at first reserve board in the 6th Chess Olympiad (women) in Medellín (+3, =0, -2).

References

External links
Margita Polanová (Tomanová) chess games at 365Chess.com
Margita Tomanová chess games at 365Chess.com

1953 births
Living people
People from Kežmarok
Sportspeople from the Prešov Region
Czechoslovak female chess players
Slovak female chess players
Chess Olympiad competitors
20th-century chess players